Police Football Club is an association football club based in Kigali, Rwanda and currently competes the Rwanda Premier League.

History 
Police FC was founded 2000 by the Rwanda National Police (RNP). The club won 2003 the Championnat National de 2e Division and was promoted in the Rwanda National Football League. In 2011 and 2012, Police FC were runners up of the Rwanda National Football League. The first win followed 2015 with winning of the Rwandan Cup and 2016 lost in the final of the cup,

Team

Current squad

Staff 
as of September 2021 
Head Coach
 Mashami Vincent 

Assistant Coach
 Alain Kirasa
 Goalkeeper coach
 Higiro Thomas 
Fitness Coach
 Mwambari Serge
Video Analyst
 Samuel Ndayishimiye

Stadium 
Police plays its home games at Nyamirambo Stadium in Kigali City

Performance in CAF competitions
CAF Confederation Cup: 1 appearance
2013 – Preliminary round

Rwandan Cup: 1 Win
2015 – Winner

Notable coaches 
 Dieudonne mdizzo MUNYANEZA (2014-2016)

Notes

Football clubs in Rwanda
Association football clubs established in 2000
2000 establishments in Rwanda